USS Roark (FF-1053), originally designated DE-1053, was a  named for William Marshall Roark, Distinguished Flying Cross recipient and first American killed in the Vietnam War to have a ship named for them.  Roark was laid down on 2 February 1966 by the Todd Shipyards Corporation in Seattle, Washington; launched on 24 April 1967, sponsored by Mrs. William M. Roark, widow and Mrs. Frank F. Roark, mother of namesake; and commissioned on 22 November 1969.

Namesake
William Marshall Roark was born 23 October 1938 in Sioux City, Iowa to Frank F. Roark (19061994) and Madge E. Roark (19091997). He grew up in Omaha, Nebraska and attended Omaha Central High School. He was appointed to the United States Naval Academy in 1956, he graduated and was commissioned ensign on 8 June 1960 and advanced to the rank of lieutenant, 1 June 1964.

He attended the naval flight school at Pensacola, Florida, and Corpus Christi, Texas, and subsequently reported for duty with Attack Squadron 153 on board . He was killed in action 7 April 1965 while flying an A-4 Skyhawk on a bombing mission over North Vietnam. He was posthumously awarded the Distinguished Flying Cross.

He was survived by his parents, his wife Karen and three children, Lisa, John and William. His remains were recovered in March 1977 and he was buried at Evergreen Memorial Park Cemetery, Omaha, Nebraska.

History 

Since completing shakedown in the spring of 1970, Roark a unit of DesRon 21, conducted training operations out of her homeport of San Diego, California, until the end of the year. With 1971 she began preparations for her first deployment with the 7th Fleet in the Western Pacific and departed from San Diego 7 January. After stopping at Pearl Harbor and refueling at Midway Island, Roark suffered a fire in her engine room.  The damage was sufficient to require her return to Pearl Harbor for repairs.  Almost two months later, in March, she was underway again for WestPac.  She remained in the western Pacific until July, when she started for home, arriving in San Diego, California, on 10 August.  For the remainder of 1971, Roark operated out of San Diego.

The new year, 1972, brought with it another deployment to the Far East. She departed San Diego on 8 February and arrived in Subic Bay, Philippines, on 29 February. She operated in the Western Pacific, primarily in the Vietnam area until 15 August, when she pointed her bow homeward.  Roark entered San Diego 30 August and remained in the vicinity for the duration of 1972 and the first eight months of 1973.  She departed San Diego in August and arrived in Subic Bay on 31 August.  After almost four months of deployment with the 7th Fleet, Roark sailed into San Diego on 21 December 1973.

[1973-1987]

Roark transferred to the Naval Reserve in 1987 and was decommissioned 14 December 1991. She was disposed of by scrapping, dismantling beginning on 13 October 2004.

Honors and awards 
Roark received three campaign stars for Vietnam War service.

Awards, citations and campaign ribbons 
According to Navsource.org:
 Combat Action Ribbon
 Navy "E" Ribbon (6)
 Navy Expeditionary Medal
 National Defense Service Medal (with one star)
 Vietnam Service Medal (with three stars)
 Humanitarian Service Ribbon
 Sea Service Deployment Ribbon
 Vietnam Campaign Medal

References 

navsource.org
navysite.de

External links 

 

Ships built in Seattle
Knox-class frigates
Cold War frigates and destroyer escorts of the United States
Vietnam War frigates and destroyer escorts of the United States
1967 ships